Chase Montgomery (born September 29, 1983) is an American professional stock car racing driver. He currently owns a small business and continues to pursue a racing career. He lives in Wilson County, Tennessee. He is now married and a father.

Career before NASCAR
Montgomery began racing go-karts at the age of 13. He began rising through the ranks very quickly and by 2000, he was a regular weekly driver at Nashville Speedway USA. In 2002, he joined the ARCA Re/MAX Series, posting four top-fives and finishing 4th in points, runner-up in the Rookie of the Year points. That year, rock singer Alice Cooper came on board as a co-owner and marketing partner of his race team. The next season, he won the season opening-race at Daytona International Speedway. In 2004, he became the youngest driver to win the pole for an ARCA race.

NASCAR career
Montgomery began his NASCAR career in 2003 with 15 starts in the Busch Series with Brewco Motorsports, posting a top-ten in his series debut at the Koolerz 300. After that season came to a close, he signed to drive the No. 8 Dodge for Bobby Hamilton Racing.  He finished 21st in points that year, and 23rd in 2005 in the No. 18. In 2006, he was to drive part-time for Curry Racing, however, after finishing the season opener at Daytona 19th, the deal fell through and Montgomery left the team.

Motorsports career results

NASCAR
(key) (Bold – Pole position awarded by qualifying time. Italics – Pole position earned by points standings or practice time. * – Most laps led.)

Busch Series

Craftsman Truck Series

ARCA Re/Max Series
(key) (Bold – Pole position awarded by qualifying time. Italics – Pole position earned by points standings or practice time. * – Most laps led.)

References

External links
 Official Website
 
 Chase on NASCAR.com
 

1983 births
Living people
People from Mount Juliet, Tennessee
ARCA Menards Series drivers
NASCAR drivers
Racing drivers from Nashville, Tennessee
Racing drivers from Tennessee